Sophomore Slump is the second album of Canadian country music duo the Reklaws. It was released on October 16, 2020, via Universal Music Canada. It includes their No. 2 hit "Where I'm From", as well as the No. 5 hit "Not Gonna Not". The album was supported by a virtual tour in the Fall of 2020.

Track listing

Charts

Singles

Release history

Awards and nominations

References 

2020 albums
The Reklaws albums
Universal Music Canada albums
Albums produced by Todd Clark